Lafayette Napoleon Dumas (March 20, 1920 – February 20, 1943) was an American Negro league outfielder in the 1940s.

A native of Muskogee, Oklahoma, Dumas played for the Memphis Red Sox in 1940 and 1941. In his 14 recorded games, he posted ten hits with a home run and three RBI in 40 plate appearances. Dumas died in 1943 at age 22.

References

External links
 and Baseball-Reference Black Baseball Stats and Seamheads

1920 births
1943 deaths
Place of death missing
Memphis Red Sox players
Baseball outfielders
Baseball players from Oklahoma
Sportspeople from Muskogee, Oklahoma
20th-century African-American sportspeople